The Desired Effect Tour is the 2015 solo concert tour by American recording artist, Brandon Flowers, who is also the lead vocalist for the rock band, The Killers.  Visiting North America and Europe, the tour supported his second album, The Desired Effect.  The tour received praise from both spectators and critics alike, including a five star review by MTV.

Background
Flowers debuted lead single "Can't Deny My Love" from The Desired Effect in Guadalajara, Mexico on March 12, 2015.  Two nights later he performed for Vive Latino 2015, live streamed across Mexico.  Flowers had originally intended to first reveal the song in his hometown of Las Vegas but was forced to postpone the show.

Opening acts
Joywave (Europe I)
Donald Cumming (North America I)
Rey Pila (North America II & III)
Joe Pug (Europe)

Tour personnel
As of the second leg of his U.S. Tour, starting July 27, 2015 in Pittsburgh Pa, tour personnel was:
Guitar: Benji Lysaght
Bass/Guitar/Keyboards/Vocals: Jake Blanton
Guitar/Keyboards: Joel Stein
Drums: Darren Beckett
Vocals: Danielle Withers
Vocals: Erica Canales
Saxophone: Matt Berman
Trumpet: Joseph Badaczewski
Lighting Design and operation by Steven Douglas

Setlist

Additional notes
During the concerts at the O2 Academy Brixton in London, England, Flowers performed "Don't Get Me Wrong" by The Pretenders and "Between Me and You" alongside Chrissie Hynde.
During the concert at the Manchester Academy in Manchester, England, Flowers performed "Bizarre Love Triangle" by New Order alongside Bernard Sumner.
During a Huey Lewis and the News concert at the Borgata Hotel in Atlantic City, Flowers performed "Do You Believe in Love" alongside Huey Lewis and the News.
During the concert at the Usher Hall in Edinburgh, Scotland, Flowers performed a special rendition of "Only The Young" on the organ that is located within the venue.
During the concert at House of Blues in Boston, Massachusetts, Flowers performed "Heart of Gold" by Buster Poindexter with Donald Cumming.
During the concert at The Wiltern, Los Angeles, Flowers performed "Rent" by Pet Shop Boys and "Human" by The Killers with Neil Tennant.
6 shows (Charlotte, Raleigh, Norfolk, Atlanta, Orlando, and Miami) of the second North American leg were canceled due what was described at the time as unforeseen circumstances. Flowers later revealed during press tour for Wonderful Wonderful (The Killers album) that he rushed home to be with his wife who was experiencing suicidal thoughts.

Tour dates

Additionally, Brandon Flowers performed at the Royal Variety Performance at Royal Albert Hall on November 13, 2015 and at Lollapalooza Argentina & Chile on March 19 and 20, 2016, respectively.

References

External links
Brandon Flowers' official website

2015 concert tours
Brandon Flowers concert tours